Reiter is an unincorporated community in Snohomish County, in the U.S. state of Washington.

History
A post office called Reiter was established in 1906, and remained in operation until 1918. The community was named after Charles G. Reiter, a businessperson in the mining industry.

References

Unincorporated communities in Snohomish County, Washington
Unincorporated communities in Washington (state)